Sullurpeta mandal is one of the mandals in Tirupati district of the state of Andhra Pradesh, India. It is the  headquarters of the Sullurupeta revenue division. The mandal is situated on the coast of Bay of Bengal, bounded by Vakadu, Chittamur, Doravarisatram and Tada mandals.

Biodiversity 
Sullurpeta mandal has brackish water ecosystem. Every year, terrestrial and aquatic birds migrate to Pulicat Lake area for a temporary stay. The ecosystem covers an area of  including parts of the mandal along with Chittamur, Doravarisatram, Tada and Vakadu mandals. The terrestrial birds include painted storks, large egrets, little egrets, grey pelicans, grey herons; water birds include northern pintails, black-winged stilts, northern shovelers, common teal, seagulls, terns, sandpipers, and common coots.

Demographics 

 census, the mandal had a population of 83,760. The total population constitute, 41,198 males and 42,562 females —a sex ratio of 1033 females per 1000 males. 8,719 children are in the age group of 0–6 years, of which 4,471 are boys and 4,248 are girls —a ratio of 950 per 1000. The average literacy rate stands at 73.31% with 55,009 literates.

Towns and villages 

Sulluru (Sullurpeta) is the most populated and Vatrapalem is the least populated settlement in the mandal.  census, the mandal has 40 settlements, that includes the following towns and villages:

Sources:
 Census India 2011 (sub districts)
 Revenue Department of AP

References

Mandals in Tirupati district